Tong Hui (born 8 March 1963) is a former Chinese diver who competed in the 1984 Summer Olympics.

References

1963 births
Living people
Chinese male divers
Olympic divers of China
Divers at the 1984 Summer Olympics
Asian Games medalists in diving
Divers at the 1982 Asian Games
Divers at the 1986 Asian Games
Asian Games gold medalists for China
Medalists at the 1982 Asian Games
Medalists at the 1986 Asian Games
Universiade medalists in diving
Universiade gold medalists for China
Medalists at the 1983 Summer Universiade
Medalists at the 1985 Summer Universiade
Medalists at the 1987 Summer Universiade
Sportspeople from Wuhan
20th-century Chinese people
21st-century Chinese people